Strelitz refers to:

 Duchy of Mecklenburg-Strelitz, former German duchy
 Grand Duchy of Mecklenburg-Strelitz, successor to the duchy
 Free State of Mecklenburg-Strelitz, state of Weimar Germany
 Mecklenburg-Strelitz (district), former district in Mecklenburg-Vorpommern, Germany
 Neustrelitz, city in Mecklenburg-Vorpommern, Germany
 Strelitz-Alt, part of Neustrelitz
 Strelitz, the German name of Střelice u Stoda, Czech Republic
 Strelitz, the German name of Strzelce, Greater Poland Voivodeship, Poland
 Strelitz, a camp at Cargill, Perthshire, Scotland, for soldiers after the Seven Years' War, in 1763
 Johannes Strelitz (1912–1991), German jurist

See also
 Streltsy